One Wild Night Live 1985–2001 is the first live album by the American rock band Bon Jovi, released on May 22, 2001. The album includes live covers of Neil Young's "Rockin' in the Free World" and performance of the Boomtown Rats' "I Don't Like Mondays", with a guest appearance by their lead singer Bob Geldof. The album charted at number 20 on The Billboard 200.

Versions of Songs
The duet of "I Don't Like Mondays" with Bob Geldof was performed at Wembley Stadium just two weeks short of the tenth anniversary of Live Aid, where Geldof performed the same song at the same stadium as part of the Boomtown Rats. He would later perform the same song almost exactly ten years later in London again at Live 8. This 1995 rendition of the song was previously released on a rare special edition 2-CD version of These Days. Several copies of the album misprint the year of the recording as 2000 however the actual year is 1995 when Bon Jovi performed at Wembley Stadium as part of the These Days tour. During the intro to the song, Jon Bon Bovi mistakenly welcomes Bob Geldof by saying to the crowd, "You should be proud to call him your own" despite Geldof being Irish, not English.

"One Wild Night 2001" is a new remix version rather than a live version. The difference between this version and the original Crush version is the length; the intro and other sections were cut out. This was released as a single for this album and featured a music video. The new version also features on the compilation album Tokyo Road: Best of Bon Jovi.

The live version of "Wanted Dead or Alive" was also released as a single and had a promotional video produced for it, this depicted live performances of the song and some backstage footage.

The three Zurich songs were recorded at the Letzigrund Stadium, and were also released on The Crush Tour DVD.

Track listing

Personnel
Jon Bon Jovi – lead vocals, guitar
Richie Sambora – guitar, backing vocals
Tico Torres – drums, percussion
David Bryan – keyboards, backing vocals
Alec John Such – bass, backing vocals (tracks 9 and 10)

Additional musicians
 Hugh McDonald – bass, backing vocals 
Bob Geldof – vocals (track 11)

Charts

Weekly charts

Year-end charts

Certifications

References

Bon Jovi live albums
Albums produced by Richie Sambora
Albums produced by Desmond Child
Albums produced by Luke Ebbin
2001 live albums
2001 compilation albums